Skummeslövsstrand is a locality situated in Laholm Municipality, Halland County, Sweden with 491 inhabitants in 2010.

It is a seaside resort on Sweden's west coast and has the country's longest beach (12 km).

SKUMMESLÖVSSTRAND is, with 17 letters, the longest name of any postal town in Sweden.

References 

Populated places in Laholm Municipality